"Jack Be Nimble" is an English language nursery rhyme. It has a Roud Folk Song Index number of 13902.1882

Lyrics
The most common version of the rhyme is:

Jack be nimble,
Jack be quick,
Jack jump over
The candlestick

Origins and meaning

The rhyme is first recorded in a manuscript of around 1815 A.D. and was collected by James Orchard Halliwell in the mid-nineteenth century. Jumping candlesticks was a form of fortune telling and a sport. Good luck was said to be signalled by clearing a candle without extinguishing the flame.

In other media 
A variation of this rhyme is featured in the song "American Pie", by Don McLean in 1971, with a play on the title of the Rolling Stones song, "Jumpin' Jack Flash":

 Jack be nimble, Jack be quick,
 Jack Flash sat on a candlestick,
 'Cause fire's the devil's only friend.

It is also a line in Lindsey Buckingham's song Holiday Road, featured in National Lampoon's Vacation:

 Jack be nimble, Jack be quick,
 Take a ride on the West Coast kick.
 Holiday road.

It is used in Welcome To The Void by the psychedelic rock band Morgen on their album Morgen in 1969:

 Jack be nimble, Jack be quick,
 Jack jump over the candlestick,
 Ouch, said Jack as he touched the lighted wick,
 My God, you know that fire burns.

It is used in My Medicine by Snoop Dogg:

 Jack be nimble, Jack be quick
 Jacked up the spoon on the candlestick.

It also features in the song Limbo Rock, by Chubby Checker:

 Jack be limbo, Jack be quick.
 Jack go under limbo stick.

The group Set It Off also uses it in their song Wolf in Sheep's Clothing.

 Jack, be nimble, Jack be quick
 Jill's a little whore and her alibis are dirty tricks

The lyric appears in Shark in the Water by V V Brown.

 Jack, be nimble, Jack be quick
 Please don't make too much of it

The video game The Elder Scrolls IV: Oblivion contains a quest called "Boots of Springheel Jak" in which the player must retrieve a pair of boots with the same name. The owner of said boots is, in keeping with the popular image, a vampire by the name of "Jakben, Earl of Imbel". The quest and boots are a reference to the mythical Spring-heeled Jack, whereas the character is a reference to both Spring-heeled Jack and "Jack Be Nimble".

Notes

Jack tales
English nursery rhymes
English poems
English folk songs
English children's songs
Traditional children's songs
Songs about fictional male characters